Colosseum and Juicy Lucy is a 1970 British concert film featuring performances of the bands Colosseum and Juicy Lucy.

External links
 

British documentary films
Concert films
1970 films
Films directed by Tony Palmer
1970s English-language films
1970s British films